Adrian Webster (born 6 November 1951) is an English retired footballer who played in England, Canada and the United States.

Webster joined Colchester United F.C. as a fourteen - year-old schoolboy, where he also started his senior career, playing at Colchester for three years from 1968–1971. After leaving Colchester he went on to play for Hillingdon F.C.

When Bobby Cram moved to Canada in 1972 to become player-coach for the Vancouver Spartans, with him he took two Colchester United players, Adrian Webster and Neil Partner. Webster went on to play with the Spartans for two seasons  In the BC Premier League. When the North American Soccer League awarded a franchise to the Seattle Sounders for the upcoming 1974 season, Seattle coach John Best spotted Webster playing in a Cup Final for the Spartans and signed him immediately.

Webster spent six seasons with the Sounders, starting off as a right back. In 1977 now Head Coach Jimmy Gabriel moved Webster into central midfield and made him team captain. That season the Sounders went on to make the play-offs, losing in the final to a New York Cosmos side which included the legendary Pelé. Webster missed a considerable number of games in his last two seasons with the Seattle Sounders owing to injuries.

In 1979, he moved to Major Indoor Soccer League where he played with the Pittsburgh Spirit. The Spirit sat out the following season and Webster turned down an offer to join Cleveland Force in favour of a move to another new franchise the Phoenix Inferno. During his first season Webster took over as head coach and lead the Inferno into the play-off's. After a poor start to their second season, Webster was sacked. However, Webster stayed in Phoenix and managed an indoor soccer facility for five years. During that time he started a soccer programme at Scottsdale Community College.

In 1989 Adrian joined forces with local property developer Tony Koleski to form the Arizona Condors, playing in the South Division of the 1989 Western Soccer League. He was General Manager/Head Coach for two seasons before the team folded. The Condors played one season in the WSL and their second season in the American Professional Soccer League (APSL).

In 1991 Webster returned to England and was soon given the Manager's job at Brightlingsea Regent. During this period Webster started a Summer Soccer Camp for Colchester United. After one season with Brightlingsea he then joined Halstead Town F.C. as Manager. In 1993 Webster was offered a full-time job in Youth Development at Colchester United where he spent 13 years working as the Soccer Centre Manager, Recruitment Officer, Youth Development Officer, Centre Of Excellence Manager and Coach of the U'16s side.

In 2006 Webster left Colchester to take up the role of Assistant Director of Football at the Colne Community School in Brightlingsea, Essex. While coaching at the Colne ex Colchester United player Steve Mc Gavin took him to Ipswich Town FC where he spent 5 years in the Youth Recruitment program. After 10 years at the Colne he is now retired. Is currently helping ex Colne player Tom Austin as his number two for FC Clacton.

References

External links
NASL/MISL stats
Webster: Seattle's quiet leader
Catching up with Sounder Adrian Webster
Colne Community School and College - Football College

Living people
1951 births
English footballers
English expatriate footballers
Colchester United F.C. players
Hillingdon Borough F.C. players
Vancouver Spartans players
Seattle Sounders (1974–1983) players
Pittsburgh Spirit players
Phoenix Inferno players
Major Indoor Soccer League (1978–1992) players
North American Soccer League (1968–1984) players
North American Soccer League (1968–1984) indoor players
English football managers
Phoenix Inferno coaches
Arizona Condors coaches
Brightlingsea Regent F.C. managers
Halstead Town F.C. managers
Association football defenders
English expatriate sportspeople in the United States
Expatriate soccer players in the United States
English expatriate sportspeople in Canada
Expatriate soccer players in Canada
Association football midfielders